Volcanic Action of My Soul is a studio album by American singer and pianist Ray Charles. It was released in April 1971 by Tangerine Records.

Track listing
Side 1
 "See You Then" (Jimmy Webb) – 4:19
 "What Am I Living For" (Art Harris, Fred Jay) – 3:36
 "Feel So Bad" (James Johnson, Leslie Temple) – 3:14
 "The Long and Winding Road" (John Lennon, Paul McCartney) – 3:04
 "The Three Bells" (Bert Reisfeld, Jean Villard) – 4:19
Side 2
 "All I Ever Need Is You" (Eddie Reeves, Jimmy Holiday) – 4:00
 "Wichita Lineman" (Jimmy Webb) – 4:03
 "Something" (George Harrison) – 4:00
 "I May Be Wrong (but I Think You're Wonderful)" (Henry Sullivan, Harry Ruskin) – 2.59
 "Down In The Valley" (Traditional) – 4:35

Personnel
Ray Charles – keyboards, vocals
Buddy Emmons – pedal steel guitar
Glen Campbell – mandolin on "All I Ever Need Is You"

References

External links 
 

Ray Charles albums
1971 albums
Albums conducted by Sid Feller
Albums arranged by Sid Feller
ABC Records albums
Tangerine Records (1962) albums